Fernando De Luca (born 1961 in Rome) is an Italian harpsichordist, teacher and composer.
He studied harpsichord with Paola Bernardi.

He is known to some people for his efforts to perform and record, for the first time, the Handel's Complete Harpsichord Compositions and Johann Christoph Graupner. He is also the first to have transcribed and recorded a number of orchestral pieces to the harpsichord, including the Sixty Complete Ouvertures from the Handel's operas and oratorios. A large number of his performances is freely available on an increasing number of specialized Ancient Music web sites.

He approached the study of counterpoint and the art of improvisation with Mons. Domenico Bartolucci, who was Maestro di Cappella for the Sistine Chapel Choir in Vatican City.

De Luca is a member of Vox Saeculorum, a society of composers working in early historical styles, whose founded by Grant Colburn, Roman Turovsky et al. De Luca is also a member of the period instruments orchestra Accademia Barocca di Santa Cecilia as keyboard soloist and basso continuo player.

Discography
 Among his several recordings available online, there are two recent editions released as physical discs: in 2017 (Nicolas Siret, 2CD) and in 2018 the Bergamo Manuscript (CD), with newly discovered music probably composed by George Frideric Handel and William Babell.
 Christophe Moyreau : Complete Harpsichord Music, Brilliant classics, april 2022, 7 CD.

Bibliography
Pieces de clavecin: en deux volumes: monumento armonico in 12 suites / Johann Mattheson; a cura di Fernando De Luca. - Roma: Bardi, 1997 (stampa 1999). - XXI, 50 p; 34 cm. (Associazione clavicembalistica bolognese ; 14). ((Ripr. facs. dell'ed.: London, printed for I. D. Fletcher and Sold at most musik shops, 1714. 
 12 Sonate a Cembalo solo, 1997
 L'Arcadia in Gianicolo - "Sonata allegorico pastorale a più parti per Cembalo solo per l'arte la pratica e il diletto nel sonar il cembalo", 1997

See also
Musical historicism
Harpsichord

References

 An Important Rediscovery, Preludes and Toccatas from the 'Bergamo manuscript'
 Bach Cantatas Website, Fernando De Luca (harpsichord)

1961 births
Living people
Italian composers
Italian male composers
Italian harpsichordists
Historicist composers
Composers for harpsichord
Vox Saeculorum